Dermatobranchus albus is a species of sea slug, a nudibranch, a marine gastropod mollusc in the family Arminidae.

Distribution
This species was described from the Indian Ocean coast of Africa. It has been reported from Indonesia and other locations in the Indo-Pacific region.

References

External links
 

Arminidae
Gastropods described in 1904